The following highways are numbered 546:

Canada

United States